Herbert Gaskin (born 29 January 1882, date of death unknown) was a cricketer. He played in three first-class matches for British Guiana in 1901/02.

See also
 List of Guyanese representative cricketers

References

External links
 

1882 births
Cricketers from British Guiana